Ihy was an Ancient Egyptian official of the Fifth Dynasty, in office most likely under king Unas. Ihy was vizier and was therefore the most important official at the royal court only second to the king. Next to the titles of a vizier, he was also overseer of the treasuries, overseer of the scribes of the king's document, overseer of all royal works and overseer of the double granary. These are also important titles, demonstrating his important position at the royal court.

Ihy was the owner of a mastaba near the pyramid of king Unas. However, the mastaba was usurped by the king's daughter Seshseshet with the beautiful name of Idut, daughter of king Teti. The names and titles of the vizier are only 
preserved on the sarcophagus in the burial chamber.

References

Literature 

Viziers of the Fifth Dynasty of Egypt
Overseer of the treasury